Cyperus squarrosus is a species of sedge known by several common names, including bearded flatsedge and awned flatsedge. It is found in wet environments in North and South America, Africa, Australia, southern Asia (China, India, Saudi Arabia, Indochina, etc.) and Italy.

Description
Cyperus squarrosus is a small sedge, reaching a maximum height between 10 and 16 centimeters. There are one to three short, thin leaves around the base of the plant. The inflorescence is a single spherical or bunched spike of up to 30 spikelets. Each spikelet is flat and has excurved awns, meaning the tip of each of the two to eight flowers on the spikelet curls outward. The spikelets are bright green to yellowish or brown. The curved awn tips and the small size of this sedge are good identifying characteristics.

References

External links
Jepson Manual Treatment
USDA Plants Profile
Photo gallery
 

squarrosus
Flora of Asia
Flora of Italy
Flora of Africa
Flora of North America
Flora of South America
Flora of Australia
Flora of Madagascar
Plants described in 1756
Taxa named by Carl Linnaeus